George Geary (1893–1981) was an English cricketer.

George Geary may also refer to:

George Reginald Geary (1872–1954), Canadian politician
George Geary, character in Fear the Walking Dead